The 2009 Lokomotiv Astana season was the club's first season, during which they played in the Kazakhstan Premier League, the highest tier of association football in Kazakhstan. They finished the season in second place, but were denied a license by UEFA to play in the UEFA Europa League the following year. In the Kazakhstan Cup, Lokomotiv Astana were knocked out in the Second Round by FC Aktobe.

Squad

Transfers

Winter

In:

Out:

Summer

In:

Out:

Competitions

Premier League

Results summary

Results

Table

Kazakhstan Cup

Squad statistics

Appearances and goals

|-
|colspan="14"|Players who appeared for Lokomotiv Astana that left during the season:

|}

Goal scorers

Clean sheets

Disciplinary record

References

FC Astana seasons
Lokomotiv Astana
Lokomotiv Astana